Arthur Crowder (4 July 1892 – 16 February 1964) was an Australian cricketer. He played one first-class match for Tasmania in 1911/12.

See also
 List of Tasmanian representative cricketers

References

External links
 

1892 births
1964 deaths
Australian cricketers
Tasmania cricketers
Cricketers from Tasmania